The Pioneer Drum & Bugle Corps was a World Class competitive junior drum and bugle corps from Milwaukee, Wisconsin. Pioneer is a former member corps of Drum Corps International (DCI).

History 

Pioneer traces its roots to the St. Patrick's (Catholic) parish of Milwaukee and its drum and bugle (D&B) corps, the Imperials of St. Patrick, founded in 1961. Both corps had been active in the Milwaukee area and the Midwest region, and both attended the inaugural DCI World Championship prelims in Whitewater, Wisconsin in 1972, with the Imperials of St. Patrick finishing in 19th place and the Thunderbolts in 28th.

By 1973, the Imperials were facing financial difficulties and the Thunderbolts were having difficulty maintaining support staff, so the two corps merged. This resulted in a 150 member corps—much larger than most drum corps of that time—with financial and staff stability. Unable to decide on a better name and wearing the vastly different uniforms of both corps, the new corps was called "The Thing" during its first season. In 1974 the corps received the sponsorship of the Pioneer Container Corporation and found a name. The Thunderbolts' cadet corps continued, joined by a second "feeder" corps known as Pioneer II. After only a few years, the Thunderbolts' part of the merger departed in favor of the Thunderbolts Cadets, leaving only the Imperials' part in place, bringing about the unit's dropping the Thunderbolts' 1953 founding as its beginning.

While not initially a strong contender, Pioneer became a regular competitor in the Midwest region during the remainder of the 1970s, and in 1978, the corps was one of the founding members of Drum Corps Midwest (DCM) which was to become the premier regional circuit in North America over the next quarter century. In 1985 the primary corps went inactive, and Pioneer II began a transition into becoming Pioneer in 1986. By 1989, Pioneer had started to become a power in Class A60. In 1991, the corps won both the DCM Division III (DIII) title and the DCI Class A60 World Championship; in 1992, they won their 3rd DCM DIII championship but finished second in DCI DIII to the Mandarins.

In 1993 Pioneer moved into Division II (DII), where the corps was an immediate challenger for the championship. The corps was DCM DII champion for four consecutive years, from 1993 to 1996. In 1994, the corps went undefeated and won the DCI DII crown. They defended their DCI title in 1995, but in 1996 fell in finals to Quebec's Les Etoiles by two-tenths of a point. Pioneer moved to Division I (DI) in 1997, and have continued to compete in that division (now known as World Class), where the corps' best finish at the DCI World Championships was 16th place in 2000. Although Pioneer won the DCM DI title in 2004 and 2005, making them the only corps to win DCM titles in 3 divisions, the most prominent corps had abandoned DCM by then and there were no other competitors for the DI titles.

In 1994, the organization was administratively dissolved by the Wisconsin Department of Financial Institutions. But in 1998, the organization was restored to good standing.

Pioneer celebrated the corps' 50th anniversary during the 2011 season.

During the 2018 season, members and staff of Pioneer sent reports to DCI and posted threads on drum corps forums regarding compliance and administrative issues. These issues included inadequate treatment for health issues and injuries sustained during the season, the organization's executive director making racist and culturally insensitive comments to the corps members as well as jokes about the holocaust, and the organization having unreliable buses with no or inadequate air conditioning during the long southern tour.

On August 16, 2018, DCI suspended Pioneer from all DCI activities, while it investigated the organization. The investigation focused on the many issues reported by members and staff, as well as possible retaliation for those who spoke out against Pioneer.

On August 24, 2018, DCI decided that Pioneer would not be allowed to participate in the 2019 season as a condition of its suspension. Following the decision, Pioneer informed DCI that they would move immediately to replace the executive director and all board members of the organization.

On January 10, 2019, DCI voted to revoke Pioneer's membership in DCI. DCI stated that if Pioneer makes operational and administrative improvements, they would be eligible to re-apply for open class participation as early as 2020.

On May 17, 2019, Pioneer announced that it will be hosting a weekend-only performance corps. The performance corps was started to be a foundation for Pioneer's plans to compete in WGI.

Sponsorship 
Pioneer Drum & Bugle Corps & Color Guard, Inc. is a 501 (c)(3) musical organization. The organization is under the direction of executive director, Bobby Bonslater and an interim Board of Advisors. Bobby Bonslater continues to struggle in several aspects to keep the corps running. Numerous unsuccessful seasons and a reputation with DCI and DCA have led to the fall of his career. However, the interim board of directors does not have the legal authority to remove current Board members, or make legal decisions on behalf of the corps without permission of the existing Board of Directors.

Winter ensembles 
On October 28, 2019, Pioneer announced that they will be hosting three different winter ensembles, which will all compete in the Winter Guard International circuit. These ensembles consist of a percussion ensemble, winds ensemble, and color guard ensemble. These winter ensembles will have show themes that stray away from being Irish, as a way for the organization to rebrand itself. The percussion ensemble will continue to field a cymbal line, as long as there are still interest and membership.

Show summary (1973–2019) 
Sources:

Traditions 
Pioneer has a tradition of Irish and Celtic influence in its uniforms and musical programs. This and the corps' shamrock logo are a heritage of the Imperials of St. Patrick.

Since the corps' days in Division III, Pioneer's motto has been "Better Every Day". This motto had been used by the Marion (OH) Cadets D&B corps, who in 1990 allowed Pioneer to also use it.

Whether it was a part of the year's musical program or not, from at least the mid-1990s Pioneer concluded each performance by marching off the field and/or "trooping the stands" (marching across the front of the grandstand in parade formation) while playing the traditional Irish air Garryowen (better known as the Garry Owen march).  This tradition has occurred less frequently since 2010 but is still performed at parades.
Purchased on St. Patrick's Day in 1993, the "Pioneer Musical Youth Center", better known as "Pioneerland", is a  property in the Milwaukee suburb of Cudahy, Wisconsin, which is the corps' own rehearsal and storage facility.

References

External links 
Official site

Drum Corps International World Class corps
Musical groups from Wisconsin
Culture of Milwaukee
Musical groups established in 1961
1961 establishments in Wisconsin